Alter Chanoch Henoch Hakohen Leibowitz (c. 1918 – April 15, 2008) was an Orthodox rabbi who was Rosh Yeshiva of Yeshivas Rabbeinu Yisrael Meir HaKohen, which was founded by his father Rabbi Chaim Dovid Hakohen Leibowitz in 1933.

Biography

Leibowitz was born in 1918 in Šalčininkai, Lithuania, and was the only son of Rabbi Dovid Leibowitz. He  came to America in 1926 when his father was hired by Mesivta Torah Vodaath as a teacher. In 1933, Rav Dovid left Torah Vodaath and founded Yeshivas Rabbeinu Yisrael Meir HaKohen. His father's death in 1941 left him in charge of the fledgling yeshiva while still in his early 20s, and he spent the rest of his life leading the yeshiva to a prominent place in American Orthodox Jewish life while building a network of Torah institutions across the United States, Canada and Israel.

Notable students

 Rabbi Dovid Harris, current rosh yeshiva of Yeshiva Chafetz Chaim
 Rabbi Akiva Grunblatt, current rosh yeshiva of Yeshiva Chafetz Chaim
 Rabbi Elyakim Rosenblatt, rebbi in Yeshiva Chafetz Chaim and later rosh yeshiva of Yeshiva Kesser Torah
 Rabbi  Moshe Chait, the Rosh Yeshiva of Yeshiva Chafetz Chaim of Jerusalem
 Rabbi Menachem Davidowitz, Rosh Yeshiva of Talmudic Institute of Upstate New York
 Rabbi Baruch Chait, Rosh Yeshiva of the Israeli high school Maarava Machon Rubin
Rabbi Shaya Cohen, Rosh Yeshiva of Yeshivas Zichron Aryeh
Rabbi Binyamin Luban, Rosh Yeshiva of Yeshiva Toras Chaim Toras Emes of Maimi
Rabbi Yossi Singer, Menahel of Mesivta Chofetz Chaim
Rabbi Mordechai Goldstein, Rosh Yeshiva of the Diaspora Yeshiva on Har Tzion in Yerushalayim.

See also 
 Yeshivas Rabbeinu Yisrael Meir HaKohen
 Chofetz Chaim (disambiguation).
 Yeshiva Tiferes Yisroel (an affiliate school)

References

Sources

External links 
Five Towns Jewish Times Obituary
Video of Rabbi Henoch Leibowitz's second wedding. https://www.youtube.com/watch?v=-2g1ehpw_xk

1910s births
2008 deaths
Lithuanian emigrants to the United States
American Haredi rabbis
Rosh yeshivas
People from Šalčininkai
Lithuanian Haredi rabbis